Annavasal may refer to:
Annavasal, Pudukkottai, a town in Pudukkottai district in Tamil Nadu, India
Annavasal, Tiruvarur, a town in Tiruvarur district in Tamil Nadu, India